Robert Allen Williams (born July 13, 1953) is an American college basketball coach and the former head men's basketball coach at the UC Santa Barbara. He is sometimes referred to as the Dean of the Big West Conference's basketball coaches. He was previously the head coach at the UC Davis, winning the NCAA Men's Division II Basketball Championship in 1998. Williams is the all-time winningest coach at UC Santa Barbara with a 19-year record of 313–260.

Coaching career 
Prior to his arrival at UCSB, Williams spent eight years at UC Davis. His UC Davis teams recorded 20 or more wins five times and had an eight-year record of 158–76 record. In Williams’ final season at UC Davis, the Aggies went 31–2, won the NCAA Division II National Championship. Williams was named NABC Division II Coach of the Year.

Williams took over a UCSB program that had not recorded a winning season in five years. In 1998–99, the Gauchos won 15 games and won the West division of the Big West. The 2002 Gauchos won the school’s first Big West tournament title, advancing to the NCAA tournament. In 2003, they won the league’s regular season title and played in the NIT. In 2007–08, UCSB set the all time school record for most wins in a season with 23. They won the Big West regular season title for a second time and received a bid to the 2008 NIT.

The 2009–10 season marked the fourth Big West Regular Season title captured during Williams' tenure at UCSB. It also was the first time in the basketball program's history that the Gauchos won both the Big West Regular Season and Big West tournament championships in the same year. Williams was also awarded the 2010 Big West Coach of the Year Award, his third. It marked the school's second trip to the NCAA tournament under Williams.

On Feb. 5, 2011, he recorded his 400th career win when his team defeated UC Davis. The 2011 team also garnered their second consecutive NCAA tournament bid. Williams became UCSB’s all-time leader in coaching victories when, on January 2, 2012, his team defeated Cal Poly. The 2015–16 Gauchos were invited to play at the inaugural Vegas 16 at the Mandalay Bay Hotel and Casino in Las Vegas. The postseason bid was the eighth for the program under Williams and a victory over Northern Illinois in the first round was its first postseason win since 1990.

Following a disappointing 2016–17 season, Williams was informed that he would not return as head coach after 19 years with the school.

Head coaching record

College

References

External links
 UC Santa Barbara profile

1953 births
Living people
American men's basketball coaches
Basketball coaches from California
College men's basketball head coaches in the United States
High school basketball coaches in the United States
Junior college men's basketball coaches in the United States
Menlo Oaks men's basketball coaches
People from Woodland, California
Pepperdine Waves men's basketball coaches
Sportspeople from Greater Sacramento
UC Davis Aggies men's basketball coaches
UC Santa Barbara Gauchos men's basketball coaches